Franck Maubert (born in 1955) is a French novelist and essayist. Maubert is the author of three novels and several works devoted to painting and song. He was a juror in the 2015 prix Françoise Sagan.

Works 
 1985: La Peinture moderne, éd. Nathan, essay
 1997: Lexique Toxique,
 2002: Est-ce bien la nuit ?, Stock, novel
 2003: Près d'elles, Flammarion, novel
 2005: Le Paris de Lautrec, éd. Assouline.
 2005: Et les arbres n'en seront pas moins verts, éd. Assouline.
 2005: Gainsbourg for ever, éd. Scali
The amazing story of the Maeght family.
 2005: La Mélancolie de Nino, éd. Scali
 2008: Le Père de mon père, éd. Philippe Rey, novel
 2009: L'odeur du sang humain ne me quitte pas des yeux : Conversations avec Francis Bacon, éd. Mille et une nuits
 2012: Le Dernier modèle, Fayard / Mille et une nuits, . Dans le Montparnasse de l'après-guerre.
 - Prix Renaudot de l'essai 2012.
 2013: Ville Close, éd. Écriture
 2014: Visible la nuit, Fayard
 2015: Les Uns contre les autres, Fayard
 2018 :L'Eau qui passe, éd. Gallimard, coll. Blanche – Prix Jean-Freustié 2019
 2019: Avec Bacon,  éd.  Gallimard
 2020 :Le bruit de la mer, éd. Flammarion

References

External links 
 Franck Maubert on Fayard
 Franck Maubert, essayiste et romancier on France Inter
 Visible la nuit, de Franck Maubert : la palette et les paillettes on Le Figaro (16 October 2014)
 Nîmes : Frank Maubert évoque Gainsbourg et la peinture au Festival de la biographie on Midi Libre
 Frank Maubert - Visible la nuit on YouTube
 Frank Maubert on Babelio

21st-century French novelists
20th-century French essayists
21st-century French essayists
1955 births
Living people
Prix Renaudot de l'essai winners